The Olkaria–Lessos–Kisumu High Voltage Power Line  is a high voltage electricity power line connecting the high voltage  substation at Olkaria, Kenya to another high voltage substation at Kisumu, Kenya.

Location

From there, the power line travels further north-west to Eldoret, in Uasin Gishu County. There, the power line turns southwesterly in direction, to terminate in the city of Kisumu, on the eastern shores of Lake Victoria.

Overview
This power line is intended to transmit power from the Olkaria geothermal electricity complex to the Western Kenya counties in the former Nyanza Province, bordering Lake Victoria. Prior to this line being constructed, the region depended on high cost thermal power derived from fossil fuels (at US$0.34 per kWh) or expensive energy imported from neighboring Uganda at US$0.22 per kWh. The transmission line is intended to supply energy to the region is sufficient quantities and at reasonable rates.

Construction
This power line project is split into three lots. The second lot, from Lessos to Kisumu, measures  and is a 220kV line, capable of transmitting 400 megawatts of power. The third lot consists of three new substations at Olkaria, Lessos and Kisumu, with a new switch yard at Kibos.

The contractors on this project include (a) Kalpataru Power Transmission limited of India (b) NARI Group Corporation, of China and (c) Sieyuan Electric Company and China. The cost of this project is valued at US$94.7 million (KSh9.5 billion). Construction is funded with loans from the Japan International Corporation Agency (JICA).

Commissioning of the completed transmission line is expected during the second half of 2021.

See also
 Energy in Kenya
 Loiyangalani-Suswa High Voltage Power Line

References

External links
 Website of Kenya Electricity Transmission Company
 Construction Safety Seminar for the ‘Olkaria Lessos Kisumu Transmission Line Construction Project' As of 10 September 2015.

   
Energy in Kenya
Energy infrastructure in Kenya
Energy infrastructure in Africa
Energy infrastructure completed in 2019
High-voltage transmission lines in Kenya